The Nansen Medal for Outstanding Research is a Norwegian medal awarded by the Nansen Fund.

The medal is awarded to scientists who have produced research of international significance of a very high level. The medal is awarded to Norwegian scientists or to scientists residing permanently in Norway.

The medal has been awarded to recipients of the Fridtjof Nansen Prize for Outstanding Research since 2003 and was approved as an official Norwegian medal by Royal Resolution on 25 April 2007.

The Nansen Prize has been awarded since 1897 and in a ceremony in 2003 all living prizewinners were awarded the medal. Since 2003 the prize and the medal have been awarded in the same ceremony.

The medal is ranked 15 in the ranking of orders, decorations and medals of Norway.

Description of the medal
 The medal is circular and silver.
 The obverse shows the head of Fridtjof Nansen surrounded by the inscription FRIDTJOF NANSENS BELØNNING FOR FREMRAGENDE FORSKNING (Fridtjof Nansen Award for Outstanding Research).
 The reverse bears the inscription FRIDTJOF NANSENS FOND TIL VIDENSKABENS FREMME (Fridtjof Nansen Fund to Promote Science) in a laurel wreath.
 The ribbon is royal blue with white edge stripes.

See also 

 Magnus Aarbakke
 Endre Berner
 Ottar Grønvik
 Victor D. Norman
 Idun Reiten
 Agnar Sandmo
 Nils Andreas Sørensen
 Nils Christian Stenseth

See also
 Orders, decorations, and medals of Norway

References
Overview of official Norwegian decorations in f-xtra, no. 1, 2009, appended to Forsvarets Forum, no. 11, 2009
Fridtjof Nansen prize for outstanding research, The Nansen Fund.

Civil awards and decorations of Norway
Awards established in 2003
2003 establishments in Norway